Lyndon John Dykes (born 7 October 1995) is a footballer who plays as a striker for EFL Championship club Queens Park Rangers. Born and raised in Australia to Scottish parents, he represents the Scotland national team. Dykes previously played for Mudgeeraba, Merrimac, Redlands United and Surfers Paradise Apollo in Australia, and for Queen of the South and Livingston in Scotland.

Personal life
Dykes was born on the Gold Coast in Queensland, Australia. He moved to Canberra, Australian Capital Territory, playing rugby league as a youth. As a child, Dykes had a season pass to the Canberra Raiders and idolised captain Ruben Wiki at the time. In his youth, Dykes also played basketball, rugby union and Aussie Rules football. After returning to Australia from a stint with Queen of the South Under-20s team, Dykes worked in a factory for sports company BLK.

Dykes said of his background, "My parents are Scottish. They are from Dumfries. My dad is from just outside Dumfries, a small town called Moniaive." His elder sister Hollie was a gold medal-winning gymnast for Australia at the 2006 Commonwealth Games. Dykes' son was born in Scotland.

Club career

Early career
Dykes spent part of his younger years living and playing rugby league in Canberra where his family settled. Dykes attracted the interest of the Canberra Raiders after helping Gungahlin Bulls to a cup final win. The move never came about as Dykes suffered an injury and his family moved back to the Gold Coast.

His uncle, a former footballer, introduced him to association football as he moved back to the Gold Coast. Dykes played youth football for Mudgeeraba before joining Merrimac. He then played in the 2015 National Premier Leagues Queensland with Redlands United and joined Gold Coast City FC the year after but soon departed to play that season for Surfers Paradise Apollo SC for one month. Dykes was rejected by A-League sides such as Brisbane Roar when playing football in Australia.

Queen of the South
Dykes toured England with the Australian schoolboys, after which he visited relatives in Dumfries, the home town of his parents. He then returned to Dumfries to play for the Queen of the South Under-20s team. He scored 22 goals in 14 competitive matches at this level before returning to Australia in January 2015.

On 7 June 2016, Dykes returned to Scotland and signed for Queen of the South, who had Gavin Skelton as their manager at that time. Dykes' senior competitive debut was representing Queen's when aged 20 in a 2–0 Scottish League Cup win versus Queen's Park at the Excelsior Stadium on 16 July. His first senior goal was on 9 August in the Queen's 3–1 League Cup win over Hibernian.

On 7 December 2017, Dykes signed an extension to his contract that kept him at the club until 31 May 2019. In three years in Dumfries, he played in 86 league matches, scoring 10 league goals and in 31 cup matches scoring nine cup goals for the Doonhamers. His best position for the Doonhamers was as a foil for Queens main striker Stephen Dobbie, especially when Dobbie scored 43 goals in the 2018–19 season, although he was also played on the wings.

Livingston
On 30 January 2019, Dykes secured a two-year contract to join Livingston, but the Doonhamers reached an agreement with the West Lothian club for him to return to Palmerston Park on loan until the end of the 2018-19 season. Dykes was utilised as a central striker at the Lions. He scored on his senior competitive debut for the Lions in a 1–1 League Cup draw at Falkirk on 13 July. On 12 September, he extended his contract with the Lions for an additional season until May 2022. On 6 October, he scored the second goal in the 2–0 home league win versus Celtic. On 21 December, he scored a hat-trick in a 4–0 win versus Ross County, the first time a Livingston player had done so in the top flight.

On 16 August 2020, Livingston announced that a bid has been accepted from a Championship club for Dykes. Three days later, it was announced that he joined Queens Park Rangers. Dykes' transfer fee broke Livingston's club record previously held by the sale of David Fernandez to Celtic in 2002. Queen of the South are due a six-figure fee as part of the deal, as a sell-on clause was included when Dykes was sold to Livingston, with the figure likely to surpass the club's £250,000 record fee received when Andy Thomson moved to Southend United in 1994.

Queens Park Rangers
On 19 August 2020, Dykes signed a four-year deal for English club Queens Park Rangers for a reported fee of £2m. On 12 September, Dykes scored on his competitive debut for the club, scoring a penalty in the 54th minute, in a 2–0 win versus Nottingham Forest. In April 2021, Dykes was named the club's Player of the Month after scoring six goals in six games most notably scoring a brace in a 4–1 win over Sheffield Wednesday on 10 April. Dykes had finished the season as QPR's top scorer with 12 goals and 5 assists.

On 16 October 2021, Dykes scored in the West London derby in Queens Park Rangers’ 4–1 loss against Fulham in the Championship.

In January 2023, Dykes was admitted to hospital with the club said to be "closely monitoring" the striker.

International career
Dykes played for Australia schoolboys prior to joining Queen of the South. He was eligible to represent either Australia (where he was born) or Scotland.

When playing with Livingston, Australia’s assistant manager Rene Meulensteen came to watch Dykes play against Celtic in October 2019. The same week, Scotland manager Steve Clarke also contacted Dykes, who "went with my heart and my gut" and chose Scotland. On 25 August 2020, Dykes was named in the Scotland squad for the first time for UEFA Nations League matches versus Israel and the Czech Republic. He made had his international debut in a 1–1 draw with Israel on 4 September and then scored his first goal for Scotland a few days later in a 2–1 victory over the Czech Republic. On 11 October, Dykes scored the winner in a Nations League match against Slovakia which ended 1–0 after steering home Stephen O'Donnell's low cross.

On 19 May 2021, Dykes was named in Scotland's UEFA Euro 2020 squad after becoming the nation's first choice striker alongside Che Adams. On 14 June, he played 79 minutes of Scotland's opening game which resulted in a 2–0 defeat to the Czech Republic. On 18 June, he played the full 90 minutes in the fixture against England at Wembley Stadium which ended in a 0–0 draw. On 22 June, he started in a 3–1 defeat to Croatia which ended Scotland's Euros campaign.

On 4 September 2021, Dykes scored in the only goal against Moldova in a 2022 World Cup qualifier. Three days later he scored a 30th-minute penalty in another 1–0 win for Scotland, this time away to Austria in the same competition. The following month, Dykes scored in narrow wins over Israel and the Faroe Islands, becoming the first Scotland player to score in four consecutive matches since Colin Stein in 1969.

In a UEFA Nations League match against Ukraine on 21 September 2022, Dykes came off the bench in the 77th minute to score a brace, in the 80th and 87th minutes respectively, to secure a 3–0 win for Scotland.

Career statistics

Club

International

Scores and results list Scotland's goal tally first, score column indicates score after each Dykes goal.

See also
 List of Scotland international footballers born outside Scotland

References

External links

1995 births
Living people
Sportspeople from the Gold Coast, Queensland
Soccer players from Queensland
Scottish footballers
Scotland international footballers
Australian soccer players
Australian people of Scottish descent
Queen of the South F.C. players
Scottish Professional Football League players
Association football forwards
Livingston F.C. players
Queens Park Rangers F.C. players
English Football League players
UEFA Euro 2020 players
Sportsmen from Queensland